RatPac Entertainment, LLC is an American media and entertainment company that finances and produces motion pictures, television, documentaries, live theater, and podcasts, owned by Brett Ratner and James Packer.

History 
RatPac Entertainment was formed in 2013 by Hollywood director and producer Brett Ratner and media and media and resort billionaire James Packer.

In September 2013, RatPac partnered with Dune Entertainment on a multi-year motion picture co-financing arrangement with Warner Bros., financing over $1 billion for 75 of the studio’s films

In December 2013, RatPac signed a deal starting as of January 1, 2014 to finance films as part of a production deal between Plan B Entertainment and New Regency.

RatPac Entertainment has co-financed 81 theatrically released motion pictures exceeding $17 billion in worldwide box office receipts. RatPac’s co-financed films have been nominated for 59 Academy Awards, 25 Golden Globes and 43 BAFTAs and have won 25 Academy Awards, 8 Golden Globes and 24 BAFTAs.

In 2021, Reddit r/wallstreetbets founder Jaime Rogozinski sold the rights to his life story to the company following the short squeeze of GameStop's stocks.

RatPac-Dune Entertainment partnership 
RatPac-Dune Entertainment, LLC was formed in September 2013 by RatPac and Dune with a multi-year 75-picture co-financing arrangement with Warner Bros. On November 26, 2013, RatPac-Dune finalized a $300 million credit facility with a group of banks, led by Bank of America Merrill Lynch, that has an option to be extended to $400 million. In November 2018, RatPac-Dune's minority ownership stake in a library of 76 Warner Bros. films was put for sale, with investors in the fund backing the library to cash out. Vine Alternative Investments made a high bid for the library, but in January 2019, Warner Bros. exercised its rights to match the bid for the library, and essentially acquired RatPac-Dune's stakes. The cost was estimated at nearly $300 million.

RatPac Films 
The 75-picture deal passively covered all movies outside of other production financing deals including those with Village Roadshow Pictures, Gulfstream and Alcon Entertainment and all Harry Potter films.

 Financed with Warner Bros. and Dune Entertainment

 Gravity (2013) (co-production with Heyday Films)
 Grudge Match (2013) (co-production with Gerber Pictures)
 The Lego Movie (2014) (co-production with Warner Animation Group and Village Roadshow Pictures)
 Winter's Tale (2014) (co-production with Village Roadshow Pictures and Weed Road Pictures)
 Blended (2014) (co-production with Happy Madison Productions and Flower Films)
 Godzilla (2014) (co-finance with Legendary Pictures and Warner Bros.)
 Edge of Tomorrow (2014) (co-production with Village Roadshow Pictures)
 Jersey Boys (2014) (co-production with GK Films)
 Tammy (2014) (with New Line Cinema) (co-production with Gary Sanchez Productions)
 Into the Storm (2014) (with New Line Cinema) (co-production with Village Roadshow Pictures)
 If I Stay (2014) (with New Line Cinema and Metro-Goldwyn-Mayer)
 This Is Where I Leave You (2014)
 Annabelle (2014) (with New Line Cinema)
 The Judge (2014) (co-production with Village Roadshow Pictures)
 Inherent Vice (2014)
 Horrible Bosses 2 (2014) (with New Line Cinema)
 American Sniper (2014) (co-production with Village Roadshow Pictures)
 Jupiter Ascending (2015) (co-production with Village Roadshow Pictures)
 Focus (2015) (co-production with Overbrook Entertainment and Di Novi Pictures)
 Run All Night (2015)
 Get Hard (2015) (co-production with Gary Sanchez Productions)
 The Water Diviner (2015)
 Mad Max: Fury Road (2015) (co-production with Village Roadshow Pictures and Kennedy Miller Mitchell)
 San Andreas (2015) (with New Line Cinema) (co-production with Village Roadshow Pictures)
 Entourage (2015) (co-production with HBO)
 Magic Mike XXL (2015)
 The Gallows (2015) (with New Line Cinema) (co-production with Blumhouse Productions)
 Vacation (2015) (with New Line Cinema)
 The Man from U.N.C.L.E. (2015)
 We Are Your Friends (2015)
 Black Mass (2015) (with Cross Creek Pictures)
 The Intern (2015)
 Pan (2015)
 Our Brand Is Crisis (2015)
 The 33 (2015)
 In the Heart of the Sea (2015) (co-production with Village Roadshow Pictures, Roth Films and Imagine Entertainment)
 Point Break (2015)
 How to Be Single (2016) (with New Line Cinema) (co-production with Metro-Goldwyn-Mayer Pictures)
 Midnight Special (2016)
 Batman v Superman: Dawn of Justice (2016) (co-production with DC Entertainment, Cruel and Unusual Films and Atlas Entertainment)
 Keanu (2016) (with New Line Cinema) (co-production with Monkeypaw Productions and Principato-Young Entertainment)
 Central Intelligence (2016) (with New Line Cinema and Universal Pictures) (co-production with Bluegrass Films)
 The Conjuring 2 (2016) (with New Line Cinema)
 The Legend of Tarzan (2016) (co-production with Village Roadshow Pictures, Jerry Weintraub Productions, and Dark Horse Entertainment)
 Lights Out (2016) (with New Line Cinema) (co-production with Atomic Monster Productions and Grey Matter Productions)
 Suicide Squad (2016) (co-production with DC Films and Atlas Entertainment)
 War Dogs (2016) (co-production with Joint Effort and The Mark Gordon Company)
 Sully (2016) (co-production with Village Roadshow Pictures, The Kennedy/Marshall Company, FilmNation Entertainment, Flashlight Films & Malpaso Productions)
 Storks (2016) (co-production with Warner Animation Group and Stoller Global Productions)
 The Accountant (2016)
 Live by Night (2016)
 Collateral Beauty (2016) (co-production with New Line Cinema, Village Roadshow Pictures, Overbrook Entertainment, Anonymous Content, PalmStar Media and Likely Story)
 The Lego Batman Movie (2017) (co-production with Warner Animation Group, Village Roadshow Pictures, DC Entertainment, and Vertigo Entertainment)
 Going in Style (2017) (co-production with New Line Cinema and Village Roadshow Pictures)
 Fist Fight (2017) (with New Line Cinema) (co-production with Village Roadshow Pictures, 21 Laps Entertainment, and Rickard Pictures)
 CHiPs (2017) (co-production with Panay Films and Primate Pictures)
 Unforgettable (2017)
 King Arthur: Legend of the Sword (2017) (co-production with Village Roadshow Pictures and Weed Road Pictures)
 Wonder Woman (2017) (co-production with DC Films, Atlas Entertainment and Cruel and Unusual Films)
 The House (2017) (co-production with New Line Cinema, Village Roadshow Pictures, Gary Sanchez Productions and Good Universe)
 Dunkirk (2017) (co-production with Syncopy Inc.)
 Annabelle: Creation (2017) (with New Line Cinema, Atomic Monster Productions and The Safran Company)
 It (2017) (with New Line Cinema) (co-production with Vertigo Entertainment, Lin Pictures and KatzSmith Productions)
 The Lego Ninjago Movie (2017) (co-production with Warner Animation Group and Vertigo Entertainment)
 Geostorm (2017) (co-production with Electric Entertainment and Skydance Media)

 Under Access Entertainment

 Justice League (2017) (co-production with DC Films, Atlas Entertainment and Cruel and Unusual Films) (under Access Entertainment)
 The 15:17 to Paris (2018)
 Game Night (2018) (co-production with Davis Entertainment)
 Ready Player One (2018) (co-production with Amblin Entertainment, Reliance Entertainment, Village Roadshow Pictures and De Line Pictures)

 Financed with Regency Enterprises and 20th Century Fox

 Aloha (2015) (co-production with Columbia Pictures, LStar Capital and Vinyl Films)
 The Revenant (2015) (co-production with New Regency, Appian Way, Anonymous Content and M Productions)
 Rules Don't Apply (2016) (co-production with New Regency, Worldview Entertainment and Shangri-La Entertainment)
 Assassin's Creed (2016) (co-production with Ubisoft Motion Pictures, New Regency, DMC Films and The Kennedy/Marshall Company)

 Financed with Universal Pictures

 The Water Diviner (2015) (co-production with Entertainment One, Mister Smith Entertainment, Seven Network, Hopscotch Features and Fear of God Films)

 Financed with Sony Pictures Entertainment

 Aloha (2015) (with Columbia Pictures) (co-production with Regency Enterprises, LStar Capital and Vinyl Films)
 Truth (2015) (with Sony Pictures Classics) (co-production with Echo Lake Entertainment, Blue Lake Media Fund, Mythology Entertainment and Dirty Films)
 I Saw the Light (2016) (with Sony Pictures Classics) (co-production with Bron Studios and CW Media Finance)

 Financed with RKO Pictures

 Barely Lethal (2015)

RatPac Documentary Films 

 Night Will Fall (2014)
 Electric Boogaloo: The Wild, Untold Story of Cannon Films (2014)
 One Day Since Yesterday: Peter Bogdanovich & the Lost American Film (2014)
 Chuck Norris vs. Communism (2015)
 The 100 Years How (2015)
 By Sidney Lumet (2015)
 In the Name of Honor (2015)
 S Is For Stanley (2015)
 Before the Flood (2016)
 Bright Lights: Starring Carrie Fisher and Debbie Reynolds (2016)
 Author: The JT LeRoy Story (2016)

RatPac Television 

 Rush Hour (2016) (with Warner Bros. Television)

References

Brett Ratner
Film production companies of the United States
Mass media companies established in 2013
2013 establishments in the United States